Cécile Renault (died 5 April 2021) was a French astrophysicist who specialized in cosmology. She was widely known for her work on the Planck space observatory.

Biography
Renault studied astronomy under the direction of Jean-Pierre Chieze and Thibault Damour.

During the launch and operation of the Planck, Renault studied high frequencies and fossil radiation surrounding the spacecraft. She became known to the public for her popular science works on the spacecraft. She also contributed to the construction of the Vera C. Rubin Observatory in Chile.

She was married to fellow astrophysicist Aurélien Barrau. She was among the 200 people who contributed to the column  in Le Monde. Cécile Renault died in a car accident on 5 April 2021.

References

2021 deaths
French astrophysicists
Max Planck Society people
Year of birth missing
Women astrophysicists
French women physicists
Science bloggers
French cosmologists
21st-century French physicists